Walter Van Renterghem (born 26 March 1944) is a Belgian long-distance runner. He competed in the marathon at the 1972 Summer Olympics.

References

External links
 

1944 births
Living people
Athletes (track and field) at the 1972 Summer Olympics
Belgian male long-distance runners
Belgian male marathon runners
Olympic athletes of Belgium
People from Poperinge
Sportspeople from West Flanders